Saint John of Senhout is an Egyptian saint from the 4th century AD.

He was born in the Egyptian city of Senhout. His father's name was Macarius and his mother's name was Anna. According to Coptic Orthodox manuscripts, a divine inspiration encouraged him to travel to the city of Athribis to confess his Christian faith and become a martyr. The city's governor tortured him, then sent him to Ansena, where he was further tortured and eventually decapitated on 8 Pashons.

The body of John of Senhout was shrouded by Julius of Akfahs, who also sent the body to Senhout, where it was placed in the city's church. Today, the saint's relics are in Shubra El Khiema, Egypt.

Sources
Coptic Synexarion

4th-century Christian saints
Saints from Roman Egypt
Egyptian torture victims